Croatia–Slovenia is a one-day cycling race that has been held annually since 2008. It is part of UCI Europe Tour in category 1.2. It was formerly known as Ljubljana-Zagreb and Zagreb-Ljubljana, but the new finish line had moved from Ljubljana to Novo Mesto.

Winners

References

External links

Cycle races in Croatia
Cycle races in Slovenia
2008 establishments in Croatia
2008 establishments in Slovenia
Recurring sporting events established in 2008
UCI Europe Tour races
Summer events in Croatia
Summer events in Slovenia